Didymops is a genus of dragonflies of the Macromiidae family. The genus contains only two species:

References 

Macromiidae
Taxa named by Jules Pierre Rambur
Anisoptera genera